Rubén Montoya (born June 18, 1940) is an Argentine former footballer who played as a goalkeeper.

Career 
Montoya played in the Campeonato Ecuatoriano de Fútbol in 1969 with América de Quito. In his debut season with America he was named the Ecuador Player of the Year. In 1970, he played with Barcelona S.C., and featured in the 1972 Copa Libertadores. In the summer of 1973 he played in the North American Soccer League with Miami Toros. In his debut season with Miami he played in 19 matches.

In 1974,  he played in the National Soccer League with Toronto Italia. The following season he played in the Mexican Primera División with UNAM Pumas. During his tenure with Pumas he assisted in securing the Copa México, and the Campeón de Campeones.

Personal life  
Montoya also served as an ordained Baptist minister.

References  

Living people
1940 births
Argentine footballers
Argentine expatriate footballers
Association football goalkeepers
Barcelona S.C. footballers
Miami Toros players
Toronto Italia players
Club Universidad Nacional footballers
Ecuadorian Serie A players
North American Soccer League (1968–1984) players
Canadian National Soccer League players
20th-century Baptist ministers
Liga MX players
Expatriate soccer players in Canada
Argentine expatriate sportspeople in Canada
Expatriate soccer players in the United States
Argentine expatriate sportspeople in the United States
Expatriate footballers in Ecuador
Argentine expatriate sportspeople in Ecuador
Expatriate footballers in Mexico
Argentine expatriate sportspeople in Mexico
Footballers from Buenos Aires